The 2006 Campbell's Hall of Fame Tennis Championships was a tennis tournament played on outdoor grass courts at the International Tennis Hall of Fame in Newport, Rhode Island in the United States and was part of the ATP International Series of the 2006 ATP Tour. It was the 31st edition of the Hall of Fame Tennis Championships and took place from July 10 through July 16, 2006.

Finals

Singles

 Mark Philippoussis defeated  Justin Gimelstob 6–3, 7–5
 It was Philippoussis' only singles title of the year and the 11th and last of his career.

Doubles

 Robert Kendrick /  Jürgen Melzer defeated  Jeff Coetzee /  Justin Gimelstob 7–6(7–3), 6–0

References

External links
 

Hall of Fame Open
Campbell's Hall of Fame Tennis Championships
 
Campbell's Hall of Fame Tennis Championships
Campbell's Hall of Fame Tennis Championships
Campbell's Hall of Fame Tennis Championships